Samson ben Ẓadok (died 1312) was a rabbi and author of Sefer Tashbeẓ (also spelled Tashbaẓ). He was a student of Rabbi Meir of Rothenburg and served his teacher while the latter was imprisoned at Ensisheim.

His work, Sefer Tashbeẓ, consists of teachings of Rabbi Meir of Rothenburg, taught to Rabbi Samson by Rabbi Meir during his time in prison. The work contains glosses by Rabbi Peretz ben Elijah.

References

1312 deaths
Authors of books on Jewish law
Date of birth unknown
Date of death unknown
Hebrew-language writers
Place of birth unknown
Place of death unknown
13th-century_rabbis
Year of birth unknown